Philip Schuyler Crooke (March 2, 1810 – March 17, 1881) was a United States representative from New York.

Born in Poughkeepsie, he graduated from Dutchess Academy, studied law, was admitted to the bar in 1831, and commenced practice in Brooklyn. He moved to Flatbush in 1838 and was a member of the Board of Supervisors of Kings County from 1844 to 1852, and from 1858 to 1870, and chairman of the board in 1861, 1862, 1864 and 1865. He was a presidential elector in 1852, voting for Franklin Pierce and William R. King; and was a Republican Union member of the New York State Assembly (Kings Co., 1st D.) in 1864.

Military service 
He served forty years in the National Guard of the State of New York, from private to brigadier general.

During the Civil War, Crooke commanded the Fifth Brigade, National Guard. He led his force into Pennsylvania in June and July 1863 during the "Emergency of 1863". Crooke's troops served on the Department of the Susquehanna under Maj. Gen. Darius Couch, and helped man the defenses of Harrisburg against a threatened attack by Confederates under Lt. Gen. Richard S. Ewell. When the Confederates retired to Virginia following the Battle of Gettysburg, Crooke and his men returned to New York for the duration of the war.

Residence 
Crooke lived in the historic Jans Martense Schenck house in the Flatlands section of Brooklyn. The house was inherited by his wife. The house came to be known as the "Martense-Crooke house". The original 2 room portion of the home was rebuilt in the Brooklyn Museum.

Congress 
Crooke was elected as a Republican to the 43rd United States Congress, holding office from March 4, 1873, to March 3, 1875. Afterwards he resumed the practice of law. He died in Flatbush; interment was in Green-Wood Cemetery, Brooklyn.

References 

1810 births
1881 deaths
People from Flatlands, Brooklyn
People of New York (state) in the American Civil War
Republican Party members of the New York State Assembly
1852 United States presidential electors
Burials at Green-Wood Cemetery
Republican Party members of the United States House of Representatives from New York (state)
19th-century American politicians